K. V. Subbiah was an Indian politician and former Member of the Legislative Assembly of Tamil Nadu. He was elected to the Tamil Nadu legislative assembly as a Dravida Munnetra Kazhagam candidate from Alangudi constituency in 1967 and 1971 elections

References 

Dravida Munnetra Kazhagam politicians
Year of birth missing
Year of death missing
Tamil Nadu MLAs 1971–1976
Tamil Nadu MLAs 1967–1972